Donald Robert Paul Roche (26 September 1916 – 30 October 2007) was a British poet, novelist, and professor of English, a critically acclaimed translator of Greek and Latin classics, notably the works of Aeschylus, Sophocles, Euripides, Aristophanes, Sappho, and Plautus. Born in Mussoorie, India, Roche was an associate of the Bloomsbury group, especially of painter Duncan Grant, whom he met in the summer of 1946 and who lived with Roche and his family until Grant's death in 1978.

He used his translation of Sophocles', Oedipus Rex, to write a screenplay for a film version of the work released in 1967 with Christopher Plummer in the title role. Roche played a small role in the Greek chorus.

Personal life
Roche was educated at Ushaw College. He was ordained as a priest in 1943. He earned his PhB and his PhL (Licentiate in Philosophy) at the Gregorianum, but left the priesthood in the 1950s. Married twice, he was a father of four children with his wife, Clarissa Tanner, whom he divorced in 1983, and one son from a prior relationship with Mary Blundell.

Significantly, he also had a long relationship with Duncan Grant. He did not get along with Grant's companion (and the mother of Grant's child) Vanessa Bell.  Roche returned to England from New York to be with Grant after Bell's death, eventually joined by his entire family. Tanner came to accept Grant's role in Roche's life, although sexual relations between Roche and Grant cooled off out of respect for Tanner.

References

External links
New York Times obituary
Obituary of Paul Roche, The Daily Telegraph, 8 November 2007
Michael and Betsy Kraft collection of Paul Roche papers at the Mortimer Rare Book Collection, Smith College Special Collections

1916 births
2007 deaths
20th-century British poets
20th-century British novelists
20th-century British translators
20th-century British male writers
Bisexual men
British LGBT poets
British LGBT novelists
British male poets
British male novelists
LGBT academics
Translators of Ancient Greek texts
20th-century LGBT people